Sex and Ethics: Essays on Sexuality, Virtue and the Good Life is a book edited by Raja Halwani in which the authors provide philosophical analyses of different aspects of human sexuality.

Reception
The book was reviewed by Andreas G. Philaretou, John A. Dick and Cheshire Calhoun.

Essays

References

External links 
 Sex and Ethics

2007 non-fiction books
Books about the philosophy of sexuality
Edited volumes
Sexual ethics books